George Charles James (2 February 1899 – 13 December 1976) was an English footballer who played as a centre-forward.

Biography 
James was born in Oldbury. He joined West Bromwich Albion in January 1920 and remained with the club for nine years. In May 1929 he moved to Reading for a fee of £650, then in February 1930 he made a £300 move to Watford. James retired from football in May 1933, later becoming a pub licensee in West Bromwich, where he died in 1976.

References 
 

1899 births
1976 deaths
People from Oldbury, West Midlands
English footballers
Association football forwards
West Bromwich Albion F.C. players
Reading F.C. players
Watford F.C. players